Cereopsius sexnotatus is a species of beetle in the family Cerambycidae. It was described by James Thomson in 1865. It is known from Malaysia and Java.

Varietas
 Cereopsius sexnotatus var. octonotatus Breuning, 1944
 Cereopsius sexnotatus var. quadriplagiatus Breuning, 1944

References

Cereopsius
Beetles described in 1865